This is a list of chairmen of the State Council of Crimea:

Notes

References

External links
Official website 
World Statesmen.org

State Council, Chairmen
Crimea, State Council
Crimea, State Council